Unus pro omnibus, omnes pro uno is a Latin phrase that means One for all, all for one. It is the unofficial motto of Switzerland. The phrase describes the relation in monotheistic faiths. God is one, 5 Moses 6:4. He is the God of all mankind, and He acts, Jeremiah 32:27. The pattern "one for all" appears in verse 50 of John 11, where the high priest Caiaphas recognises "that it is expedient for us, that one man should die for the people, and that the whole nation perish not". This attitude is taken up in the character of Arnold von Winkelried. A French version, was made famous by Alexandre Dumas in the 1844 novel The Three Musketeers.

Early uses 
In 1594, William Shakespeare uses it in his poem The Rape of Lucrece to characterize people who take massive risks, including the poem's villainous rapist king, Tarquin the Proud:

 The aim of all is but to nurse the life
 With honour, wealth, and ease, in waning age;
 And in this aim there is such thwarting strife,
 That one for all, or all for one we gage;
 As life for honour in fell battle's rage;
 Honour for wealth; and oft that wealth doth cost
 The death of all, and all together lost.

Many of Shakespeare's contemporaries recognized him not for plays like Hamlet and Macbeth, but poems like Lucrece and Venus and Adonis. Thus, his use of it could have contributed to more widespread usage, since these poems were commercial successes in his time.

In a meeting in 1618 between leaders of the Bohemian, Catholic, and Protestant communities, which resulted in the third defenestration of Prague, a representative of the Protestants read a letter affirming, "As they also absolutely intended to proceed with the execution against us, we came to an unanimous agreement among ourselves that, regardless of any loss of life and limb, honor and property, we would stand firm, with all for one and one for all... nor would we be subservient, but rather we would loyally help and protect each other to the utmost, against all difficulties."

The Three Musketeers

Tous pour un, un pour tous (All for one, and one for all) is a motto traditionally associated with the titular heroes of the novel The Three Musketeers written by Alexandre Dumas père, first published in 1844. In the novel, it was the motto of a group of French musketeers named Athos, Porthos, Aramis and d'Artagnan who stayed loyal to each other through thick and thin.

On November 30, 2002, in an elaborate but solemn procession, six Republican Guards carried the coffin of Dumas from its original interment site in the Cimetière de Villers-Cotterêts in Aisne to the Panthéon. The coffin was draped in a blue velvet cloth inscribed with the motto.

As a motto

Traditional motto of Switzerland

Switzerland has no official motto defined in its constitution or legislative documents. 

The phrase was increasingly associated with the founding myths of Switzerland, which often also have solidarity as a central theme, to such a degree that "" was even written in the cupola of the Federal Palace of Switzerland in 1902. It has since been considered the motto of the country. Politicians of all parties and regions acknowledge it as the motto of Switzerland.

Others
A part of the phrase in the Romanian language,  ("One for All"), was briefly used as the motto of the United Principalities of Moldavia and Wallachia (a predecessor of modern Romania) between 1862 and 1866, when it was replaced by Nihil sine Deo ("Nothing without God").

See also

 E pluribus unum

References

Latin mottos
History of Switzerland
Alexandre Dumas
National symbols of Switzerland
17th-century neologisms
The Three Musketeers
Majority–minority relations